Ubiquitin carboxyl-terminal hydrolase or Ubiquitin specific protease 11 is an enzyme that in humans is encoded by the USP11 gene. USP11 belongs to the Ubiquitin specific proteases family (USPs) which is a sub-family of the Deubiquitinating enzymes (DUBs).USPs are multiple domain proteases and belong to the C19 cysteine proteases sub‒family. Depending on their domain architecture and position there is different homology between the various members. Generally the largest domain is the catalytic domain which harbours the three residue catalytic triad that is included inside conserved motifs (Cys and His boxes). The catalytic domain also contains sequences that are not related with the catalysis function and their role is mostly not clearly understood at present, the length of these sequences varies for each USP and therefore the length of the whole catalytic domain can range from approximately 295 to 850 amino acids. Particular sequences inside the catalytic domain or at the N‒terminus of some USPs have been characterised as UBL (Ubiquitin like) and DUSP (domain present in ubiquitin‒specific proteases) domains respectively. In some cases, regarding the UBL domains, it has been reported to have a catalysis enhancing function as in the case of USP7. In addition, a so‒called DU domain module is the combination of a DUSP domain followed by a UBL domain separated by a linker and is found in USP11 as well as in USP15 and USP4.

USP11 is 963aa protein with a MW of approximately 109.8 kDa and a pI of ~5.28; it shares significant homology with USP15 and along with USP4 forms the DU subfamily. Nevertheless, alignment of the three USPs confirms that USP15 and USP4 are the closest homologues with the identity reaching ~73 % between their UBL1 domains whereas USP11 is the most distant member with an identity of only ~32.3 % when compared to USP15. An UBL2 domain insertion (285aa) is present within the catalytic domain, which encompasses amino acids 310‒931, and the catalytic triad consists of a cysteine, a histidine and an aspartic acid.

Function 

Protein ubiquitination controls many intracellular processes, including cell cycle progression, transcriptional activation, and signal transduction. This dynamic process, involving ubiquitin conjugating enzymes and deubiquitinating enzymes, adds and removes ubiquitin. Deubiquitinating enzymes are cysteine proteases that specifically cleave ubiquitin from ubiquitin-conjugated protein substrates. This gene encodes a deubiquitinating enzyme which lies in a gene cluster on chromosome Xp11.23

Interactions 

USP11 has been shown to interact with RANBP9.

Model organisms 

Model organisms have been used in the study of USP11 function. A conditional knockout mouse line called Usp11tm1(KOMP)Wtsi was generated at the Wellcome Trust Sanger Institute. Male and female animals underwent a standardized phenotypic screen to determine the effects of deletion. Additional screens performed: In-depth immunological phenotyping

References

Further reading